Anselmo Raguileo Lincopil (3 May 1922 - 29 February 1992) was a Chilean linguist, historian, researcher and poet of the Mapuche people. He developed the Raguileo Alfabet.

Life
Raguileo Anselmo was born May 3, 1922, in Saltapura, Chile, 16 kilometers southeast of Nueva Imperial. His primary studies were at the Boroa Mission School and later at Missionary Padre Las Casas. He did his secondary studies at the Industrial School of Temuco, graduating in Metallurgy Office Technician.

Raguileo Anselmo later he moved to Santiago to study chemistry at the School of Arts and Crafts. He graduated as a Chemist in 1944. From 1952 to 1956, Raguileo Anselmo studied linguistics and was a language teacher.  He Mapuche culture in the Pedagogical Institute of the University of Chile.

1922 births
1992 deaths
Mapuche
Lincopil
20th-century Chilean historians
20th-century Chilean male writers
20th-century Mapuche people
Mapuche historians
Mapuche linguists
Linguists of Mapuche
Historians of the Mapuche world
Linguists of indigenous languages of South America
Mapuche poets
20th-century linguists